Events from the year 1918 in the United States.

Incumbents

Federal Government 
 President: Woodrow Wilson (D-New Jersey)
 Vice President: Thomas R. Marshall (D-Indiana)
 Chief Justice: Edward Douglass White (Louisiana)
 Speaker of the House of Representatives: Champ Clark (D-Missouri)
 Congress: 65th

Events

January–March
 January – The World Tomorrow pacifist magazine begins publication.
 January 8 – President Woodrow Wilson delivers his Fourteen Points speech.
 February 21 – The last Carolina parakeet (the last breed of parrot native to the eastern U.S.), a male named "Incas", dies at Cincinnati Zoo.
 March – The Liberator socialist magazine begins publication.
 March 4 – A soldier at Camp Funston, Kansas falls sick with the first confirmed case of the Spanish flu.
 March 19 – The U.S. Congress establishes time zones and approves daylight saving time (DST goes into effect on March 31).

April–June
 April 21 – The 6.7  San Jacinto earthquake shakes southern California with a maximum Mercalli intensity of IX (Severe), causing $200,000 in damage, one death, and several injuries.
 May 2 – General Motors acquires the Chevrolet Motor Company of Delaware.
 May 15 – The United States Post Office Department (later renamed the United States Postal Service) begins the first regular airmail service in the world (between New York City, Philadelphia and Washington, DC).
 May 16 – The Sedition Act of 1918 is approved by the U.S. Congress.
 May 22 – The small town of Codell, Kansas is hit for the fith year in a row by a tornado. Coincidentally, all three tornadoes hit on the same date.
 May 23 – First victims of the "axeman of New Orleans" in a 17-month series of brutal murders mainly directed at Italian American shopkeepers and their families; the serial killer is never identified.
 June 8 – The total solar eclipse of June 8, 1918 crosses the United States from Washington State to Florida.
 June 22
 Suspects in the Chicago Restaurant Poisonings are arrested, and more than 100 waiters are taken into custody, for poisoning restaurant customers with a lethal powder called Mickey Finn.
 Hammond Circus Train Wreck: A locomotive engineer fell asleep and ran his troop train into the rear of a circus train near Hammond, Indiana. The circus train held 400 performers and roustabouts of the Hagenbeck-Wallace Circus.

July–September

 July 9 – Great Train Wreck of 1918: In Nashville, Tennessee, an inbound local train collides with an outbound express, killing 101 and injuring 171. It is considered the worst rail accident in U.S. history.
 August – A deadly second wave of the Spanish flu starts in France, Sierra Leone and the United States.
 August 13 – Opha May Johnson becomes the first woman to enlist in the United States Marine Corps.
 August 27 – Border War; Battle of Ambos Nogales – U.S. Army forces skirmish with Mexican Carrancistas at Nogales, Arizona, in the only battle of World War I fought on U.S. soil.
 September 11 – The Boston Red Sox defeat the Chicago Cubs for the 1918 World Series championship, their last World Series win until 2004.
 September 12–15 – World War I: Battle of Saint-Mihiel fought in France: The first and only offensive launched solely by the American Expeditionary Forces under John J. Pershing overcomes German forces in the Saint-Mihiel salient.

October–December
 October 4 – The T. A. Gillespie Company Shell Loading Plant explosion in New Jersey kills 100+, and destroys enough ammunition to supply the Western Front for 6 months.
 October 8 – World War I: In the Forest of Argonne in France, U.S. Corporal Alvin C. York almost single-handedly kills 25 German soldiers and captures 132.
 October 11 – The 7.1  San Fermín earthquake shakes Puerto Rico with a maximum Mercalli intensity of IX (Violent), killing 76–116 people. A destructive tsunami contributed to the damage and loss of life.
 October 12 – 1918 Cloquet Fire: The city of Cloquet, Minnesota and nearby areas are destroyed in a fire, killing 453.
 October 25 – The  sinks on Vanderbilt Reef near Juneau, Alaska; 353 people die in the greatest maritime disaster in the Pacific Northwest.
 November 1 – Malbone Street Wreck: The worst rapid transit accident in world history occurs under the intersection of Malbone Street and Flatbush Avenue, in Brooklyn, New York City, with at least 93 dead.
 November 11 – World War I ends.
 December 4 – President of the U.S. Woodrow Wilson sails for the Paris Peace Conference, becoming the first U.S. president to travel to Europe while in office.
 December 19 – Ripley's Believe It or Not! first appears as a cartoon under the title Champs and Chumps in The New York Globe.

Undated
 The Native American Church is formally founded.
 The Association Against the Prohibition Amendment is founded to oppose Prohibition in the U.S.
 George Drumm's concert march "Hail, America" is first performed in New York City.

Ongoing
 Progressive Era (1890s–1920s)
 Lochner era (c. 1897–c. 1937)
 U.S. occupation of Haiti (1915–1934)
 World War I, U.S. involvement (1917–1918)
 First Red Scare (1917–1920)

Births

January

 January 1 – Ed Price, American soldier, pilot, and politician (d. 2012)
 January 9 – Alma Ziegler, American female professional baseball player (d. 2005)
 January 15 – Ira B. Harkey Jr., American newspaper editor (d. 2006)
 January 16 – Stirling Silliphant, American screenwriter and producer (d. 1996)
 January 17 – George M. Leader, American politician (d. 2013)
 January 19
 Peter Hobbs, American actor (d. 2011)
 John H. Johnson, African-American publisher, founder of Ebony (d. 2005)
 January 20 – Nevin S. Scrimshaw, American food scientist (d. 2013)
 January 21 – Richard Winters, American World War II soldier (d. 2011)
 January 23 – Gertrude B. Elion, American pharmacologist, winner of Nobel Prize in Physiology or Medicine in 1988 (d. 1999)
 January 24 – Oral Roberts, American neo-Pentecostal televangelist (d. 2009)
 January 25 – Ernie Harwell, American baseball sportscaster (d. 2010)
 January 26
 Philip José Farmer, American writer (d. 2009)
 Vito Scotti, American actor (d. 1996)
 January 27 – Elmore James, American musician (d. 1963)
 January 29 – John Forsythe, American actor (Dynasty) (d. 2010)
 January 31 – Millie Dunn Veasey, African-American civil rights activist and World War II soldier (d. 2018)

February

 February 3
 Millie Bailey, World War II veteran and civil servant (d. 2022)
 Joey Bishop, American entertainer, member of the "Rat Pack" (d. 2007)
 Martin Greenberg, American poet and translator (d. 2021)
 Helen Stephens, American athlete (d. 1994)
 February 8
 Fred Blassie, American professional wrestler, novelty singer (Pencil Neck Geek) (d. 2003)
 Walter Newton Read, American lawyer and second chairman of the New Jersey Casino Control Commission (d. 2001)
 February 12 – Julian Schwinger, American physicist, Nobel Prize laureate (d. 1994)
 February 15 
 Allan Arbus, American actor (M*A*S*H) (d. 2013)
 William T. Young, American businessman (d. 2004)
 February 16 – Patty Andrews, American singer (The Andrews Sisters) (d. 2013)
 February 17 – William Bronk, American poet (d. 1999)
 February 19 – Fay McKenzie, American silent film actress (d. 2019)
 February 21 – Robert E. Thacker, American aviator and test pilot (d. 2020)
 February 22
 Charlie Finley, American businessman (d. 1996)
 Don Pardo, American television announcer (Saturday Night Live) (d. 2014)
 Robert Pershing Wadlow, American tallest man record-holder (d. 1940)
 February 25
 Barney Ewell, American athlete (d. 1996)
 Bobby Riggs, American tennis player (d. 1995)
 February 26
 Otis R. Bowen, American politician (d. 2013)
 Theodore Sturgeon, American writer (d. 1985)

March

 March 1 – James N. Morgan, American economist (d. 2018)
 March 3 – Arthur Kornberg, American biochemist, recipient of the Nobel Prize in Physiology or Medicine (d. 2007)
 March 4 – Margaret Osborne duPont, American female tennis player (d. 2012)
 March 5 – James Tobin, American economist, Nobel Prize laureate (d. 2002)
 March 8 – Mendel L. Peterson, American underwater archaeologist (d. 2003)
 March 9
 George Lincoln Rockwell, American Nazi leader (d. 1967)
 Mickey Spillane, American writer (d. 2006)
 March 11 – Jack Coe, American evangelist (d. 1956)
 March 12 – Elaine de Kooning, American artist (d. 1989)
 March 13 – Eddie Pellagrini, American baseball player, coach (d. 2006)
 March 15 – Richard Ellmann, American literary biographer (d. 1987)
 March 16 – Frederick Reines, American physicist, winner of Nobel Prize in Physics in 1995 (d. 1998)
 March 17 – Ross Bass, American politician (d. 1993)
 March 18 – Bob Broeg, American sports writer (d. 2005)
 March 20 – Jack Barry, American television game show host, producer (d. 1984)
 March 23
 Helene Hale, American politician (d. 2013)
 Stick McGhee, American jump blues singer, guitarist, and songwriter (d. 1961)
 March 25 – Howard Cosell, American attorney, lecturer, and sports journalist (d. 1995)
 March 26 – Lloyd McCuiston, American politician 
 March 29
 Pearl Bailey, African-American singer, actress (d. 1990)
 Shirley Jameson, American female baseball player (d. 1993)
 Sam Walton, founder of Wal-Mart (d. 1992)

April

 April 1 – Milt Earnhart, American politician (d. 2020)
 April 4 – Joseph Ashbrook, American astronomer (d. 1980)
 April 7 – Bobby Doerr, American baseball player (d. 2017)
 April 8
 Betty Ford, First Lady of the United States, Second Lady of the United States (d. 2011)
 Charles P. Roland, American historian
 April 14 – Mary Healy, American actress, variety entertainer and singer (d. 2015)
 April 15
Louis O. Coxe, American writer (d. 1993)
 Edmund Jones, American politician (d. 2019)
 April 17
 William Holden, American actor (d. 1981)
 Anne Shirley, American actress (d. 1993)
 April 18 – Clifton Hillegass, American author, founder of CliffsNotes (d. 2001)
 April 20 – Edward L. Beach Jr., American naval captain and author (d. 2002)
 April 22
 Mickey Vernon, American baseball player (d. 2008)
 William Jay Smith, American poet (d. 2015)
 April 24 – Lou Dorfsman, American graphic designer (d. 2008)
 April 27 – John Rice, American baseball umpire (d. 2011)
 April 28
 Mildred Persinger, American feminist (d. 2018)
 Rodger Wilton Young, United States Army soldier, remembered in the song "The Ballad of Rodger Young" (d. 1943)
 April 29 – George Allen, American football coach (d. 1990)

May

 May 1 – Jack Paar, American television show host (The Tonight Show) (d. 2004)
 May 3 – Richard Dudman, American reporter, editorial writer (St. Louis Post-Dispatch) (d. 2017)
 May 9
 Russell M. Carneal, American politician, judge (d. 1998)
 Orville Freeman, American politician (d. 2003)
 Mike Wallace, American journalist (d. 2012)
 May 10
 T. Berry Brazelton, American pediatrician (d. 2018)
 Jane Mayhall, American poet and novelist (d. 2009)
 George Welch, U.S. soldier and pilot (d. 1954)
 May 11
 Richard Feynman, American physicist, winner of Nobel Prize in Physics in 1965 (d. 1988)
 Phil Rasmussen, American pilot (d. 2005)  
 May 12 – Julius Rosenberg, American-born Soviet spy (d. 1953)
 May 15 – Eddy Arnold, American country music singer (d. 2008)
 May 17 – A. C. Lyles, American film producer (d. 2013)
 May 18 
 Claudia Bryar, American actress (d. 2011)
 Joe Krush, American illustrator (d. 2022)
 May 20 – Edward B. Lewis, American geneticist, recipient of the Nobel Prize in Physiology or Medicine (d. 2004)
 May 21 – Lloyd Hartman Elliott, American educator, president of George Washington University (d. 2013)
 May 23 
 Frank Mancuso, American major league baseball player, politician (d. 2007)
 Naomi Replansky, American poet (d. 2023)

June

 June 2 – Kathryn Tucker Windham, American writer, storyteller (d. 2011)
 June 4 – Johnny Klein, American drummer (d. 1997)
 June 6 – Edwin G. Krebs, American biochemist, winner of Nobel Prize in Physiology or Medicine in 1992 (d. 2009)
 June 8 
 Robert Preston, American actor (The Music Man) (d. 1987)
  1918   – John D. Roberts, American chemist and academic (d. 2016)
  1918   – John H. Ross, American captain and pilot (d. 2013)
 June 9 – John Hospers, American philosopher (d. 2011)
 June 10 – Wood Moy, American actor (d. 2017)
 June 12 – Jerry A. Moore Jr., American politician (d. 2017)
 June 18
 Jerome Karle, American chemist, Nobel Prize laureate (d. 2013)
 Lillian Ross, American journalist on The New Yorker (d. 2017)
 Elisabeth Waldo, American violinist, composer 
 June 21
 Dee Molenaar, American mountaineer, author and artist (d. 2020)
 Josephine Webb, American engineer
 June 25 – Sid Tepper, American songwriter (d. 2015)
 June 26 – Raleigh Rhodes, American combat fighter pilot (d. 2007)
 June 27 – Adolph Kiefer, American former competition swimmer (d. 2017)
 June 28 – Marshall Brown, American professional basketball player (d. 2008)
 June 29
 Gene La Rocque, U.S. admiral (d. 2016)
 Francis W. Nye, United States Air Force major general (d. 2019)

July

 July 1 – Ralph Young, American singer, actor (d. 2008)
 July 3
 Johnny Palmer, American golfer (d. 2006)
 Shirley Adelson Siegel, American activist and lawyer (d. 2020)
 Ben Thompson, American architect and designer (d. 2002)
 July 4 
 Joe Fortunato, American football, basketball, and baseball coach (d. 2004)
 Eppie Lederer, American journalist and radio host (d. 2002)
 Johnnie Parsons, American race car driver (d. 1984)
 Pauline Phillips, American journalist and radio host, creator of Dear Abby (d. 2013)
 July 5 – George Rochberg, American composer (d. 2005)
 July 6 
 J. Dewey Daane, American economist (d. 2017)
 Herm Fuetsch, American professional basketball player (d. 2010)
 July 7 – Bob Vanatta, American head basketball coach (d. 2016)
 July 8
 Edward B. Giller, U.S. major general (d. 2017)
 Craig Stevens, American actor (d. 2000)
 Paul B. Fay, American businessman, soldier, and diplomat, 12th United States Secretary of the Navy (d. 2009)
 July 10 
 Chuck Stevens, American major baseball (d. 2018)
 Frank L. Lambert, American professor emeritus of chemistry at Occidental College (d. 2018)
 July 12 
 Doris Grumbach, American novelist, memoirist, biographer, literary critic, and essayist (d. 2022)
 Alice Van-Springsteen, American stuntwoman, jockey (d. 2008)
 Vivian Mason, American actress (d. 2009)
 Paul Stenn, American football offensive tackle (d. 2003)
 July 14
 Jay Wright Forrester, American computer engineer, systems scientist (d. 2016)
 Arthur Laurents, American novelist and screenwriter (d. 2011)
 July 16 – Leonard T. Schroeder, American colonel (d. 2009)
 July 17 – Chandler Robbins, American ornithologist (d. 2017)
 July 18 
 James Duesenberry, American economist (d. 2009)
 Warren Hair, American professional basketball player (d. 2006)
 July 20
 Edward S. Little, American diplomat (d. 2004)
 Cindy Walker, American songwriter, country singer (d. 2006)
 July 22 – Stanley Lebergott, American government economist (d. 2009)
 July 23 
 Carl T. Langford, American politician (d. 2011)
 Pee Wee Reese, American baseball player (d. 1999)
 July 24 – Irving London, American hematologist and geneticist (d. 2018)
 July 25 – Jane Frank, American artist (d. 1986)
 July 26 – Marjorie Lord, American actress (d. 2015)
 July 27 – Leonard Rose, American cellist (d. 1984)
 July 29 – Edwin O'Connor, American novelist, Pulitzer Prize for Fiction winner (d. 1968)
 July 30 
 John L. Cason, American actor (d. 1961)
 Jimmy Robinson, American actor (d. 1967)
 July 31
 Paul D. Boyer, American chemist, Nobel Prize laureate (d. 2018)
 Hank Jones, American pianist (d. 2010)

August

 August 3 – Sidney Gottlieb, American Central Intelligence Agency official (d. 1999)
 August 6 – Charles Coulston Gillispie, American historian (d. 2015)
 August 9 – Robert Aldrich, American writer and filmmaker (d. 1983)
 August 12 – Roy C. Bennett, American songwriter (d. 2015)
 August 13 – Tao Porchon-Lynch, American yoga master and author (d. 2020)
 August 19 – Oliver Brown, African-American plaintiff (d. 1961)
 August 20 – Jacqueline Susann, American novelist (d. 1974)
 August 21 – Bruria Kaufman, American-born Israeli physicist (d. 2010 in Israel)
 August 22 – Martin Pope, American physical chemist
 August 23 – Bernard Fisher, American surgeon (d. 2019)
 August 25 – Leonard Bernstein, American composer and conductor (d. 1990)
 August 26
 Hutton Gibson, American religion writer, father of actor Mel Gibson (d. 2020)
 Katherine Johnson, African-American physicist and mathematician (d. 2020)
 August 27 – Simeon Booker, American journalist (d. 2017)
 August 30 – Ted Williams, American baseball player (d. 2002)
 August 31
 Griffin Bell, American politician (d. 2009)
 Alan Jay Lerner, American lyricist (d. 1986)
 Kenny Washington, African-American football player (d. 1971)

September

 September 1 – James D. Martin, American politician (d. 2017)
 September 3 – Helen Wagner, American soap opera actress (d. 2010)
 September 4
 Paul Harvey, American radio broadcaster (d. 2009)
 Gerald Wilson, American jazz trumpeter (d. 2014)
 September 6 – Hugh Gillis, American politician (d. 2013)
 September 13
 Ray Charles, American musician, singer and songwriter (d. 2015)
 Rosemary Kennedy, sister of John F. Kennedy (d. 2005)
 September 15 – Nipsey Russell, African-American comedian (d. 2005)
 September 19 – Joseph Zeller, American politician (d. 2018)
 September 21 – John Gofman, American Manhattan Project scientist, advocate (d. 2007)
 September 26 
 Harry Yee, American bartender (d. 2022)
 John Zacherle, American television and radio host, singer, and voice actor (d. 2016)
 September 28
 Arnold Stang, American Comic Actor (d. 2009)

October

 October 4 – Adrian Kantrowitz, American cardiac surgeon (d. 2008)
 October 9 – E. Howard Hunt, American Watergate break-in coordinator (d. 2007)
 October 13 – Robert Walker, American actor (d. 1951)
 October 17 – Rita Hayworth, American actress (d. 1987)
 October 18 – Bobby Troup, American singer-songwriter and actor, known for his role in Emergency! (d. 1999)
 October 19 – Robert S. Strauss, American politician, Democratic National Committee Chairman (d. 2014)
 October 22 – Fred Caligiuri, American baseball player (d. 2018)
 October 23
 Augusta Dabney, American actress (d. 2008)
 Paul Rudolph, American architect (d. 1997)
 October 25 – Milton Selzer, American actor (d. 2006)
 October 27 – Teresa Wright, American actress (d. 2005)
 October 29 – Diana Serra Cary, born Peggy-Jean Montgomery ("Baby Peggy"), American silent film child actress (d. 2020)
 October 31 – Ian Stevenson, American parapsychologist (d. 2007)

November

 November 3
 Bob Feller, American baseball player (d. 2010)
 Ann Hutchinson Guest, American movement, dance researcher (d. 2022)
 Elizabeth P. Hoisington, American Brigadier General (d. 2007)
 Russell B. Long, United States Senator from Louisiana (d. 2003)
 Dean Riesner, American film, television screenwriter (d. 2002)
 November 4
 Art Carney, American actor, best known for his role in The Honeymooners (d. 2003)
 Cameron Mitchell, American actor, best known for his role in The High Chaparral (d. 1994)
 November 7
 Fred Cusick, American ice hockey broadcaster (d. 2009)
 Billy Graham, evangelist (d. 2018)
 November 8 – Bob Schiller, American screenwriter (d. 2017)
 November 9
 Spiro Agnew, 39th Vice President of the United States from 1969 to 1973 (d. 1996)
 Thomas Ferebee, United States Air Force colonel (d. 2000)
 November 10 – John Henry Moss, American baseball executive, politician (d. 2009)
 November 11 – Louise Tobin, American singer (d. 2022)
 November 21 – Dorothy Maguire, American professional baseball player (d. 1981)
 November 28 – Jack H. Harris, American film producer, distributor and actor (d. 2017)
 November 29 – Madeleine L'Engle, children's fiction writer (d. 2007)
 November 30 – Efrem Zimbalist, Jr., American actor (d. 2014)

December

 December 6 – Nick Drahos, American football player (d. 2018)
 December 10 – Anne Gwynne, American actress (d. 2003)
 December 11 – John W. Reed, American legal scholar (d. 2018)
 December 12 – Joe Williams, American jazz singer (d. 1999)
 December 14 – Jack Cole, American cartoonist (d. 1958)
 December 15 – Jeff Chandler, American actor (d. 1961)
 December 17 – Dusty Anderson, American actress and model (d. 2007)
 December 18 – Hal Kanter, American comedy writer, producer and director (d. 2011)
 December 20 – Joseph Payne Brennan, American poet, author (d. 1990)
 December 21
 Fred Gloden, American football player (d. 2019) 
 Donald Regan, American Treasury Secretary, White House Chief of Staff (d. 2003)
 December 24 – Dave Bartholomew, American musician, bandleader, composer and arranger (d. 2019)
 December 25
 Henry Hillman, American businessman and philanthropist (d. 2017)
 George S. Vest, American diplomat (d. 2021)
 December 26 – Butch Ballard, American jazz drummer (d. 2011)
 December 29 – Leo J. Dulacki, American general (d. 2019)
 December 31 – Al Lakeman, American Major League Baseball catcher (d. 1976)

Deaths 

 January 8 – Ellis H. Roberts, politician (born 1827)
 February 2 – John L. Sullivan, boxer, World Heavyweight Champion (born 1858)
 February 7 – Effie Hoffman Rogers, educator, editor and journalist (born 1835/37)
 February 15 – Vernon Castle, ballroom dancer (born 1887)
 March 10 – Jim McCormick, baseball pitcher (born 1856 in Scotland)
 March 14 – Lucretia Garfield, First Lady of the United States (born 1832)
 March 16 – Prosper P. Parker, civil engineer, Union Army officer and politician (born 1835 in Canada)
 March 27 – Henry Adams, historian (born 1838)
 April 14 – James E. Ware, architect who devised the "dumbbell plan" for New York City tenements (born 1846)
 May 1 – Grove Karl Gilbert, geologist (born 1843)
 May 5 – Bertha Palmer, businesswoman, socialite and philanthropist (born 1849)
 May 14 – James Gordon Bennett, Jr., newspaper publisher (born 1841)
 May 17 – William Drew Robeson, African American Presbyterian minister, escaped slave and father of Paul Robeson (born 1844)
 May 19 – Raoul Lufbery, fighter pilot (killed in action; born 1885 in France)
 May 27 – Frederick Trump, German American businessman, paternal grandfather of Donald Trump (born 1869)
 June 4 – Charles W. Fairbanks, 26th Vice President of the United States from 1905 to 1909 and U.S. Senator from Indiana from 1897 to 1905 (born 1852)
 June 18 – Lizzie Halliday, serial killer (born c.1859)
 June 25 – Jake Beckley, baseball player (born 1867)
 June 27 – George Mary Searle, astronomer (born 1839)
 June 28 – Albert Henry Munsell, inventor of the Munsell color system (born 1858)
 July 20 – Francis Lupo, U.S. Army soldier (killed in action; born 1895)
 July 27 – Gustav Kobbé, music critic and author (sailing accident; born 1857)
 July 30 – Joyce Kilmer, poet (killed in action; born 1886)
 August 1 – John Riley Banister, policeman and cowboy (born 1854)
 August 10 – William Pitt Kellogg, U.S. Senator from Louisiana from 1868 to 1872 and from 1877 to 1883 (born 1830)
 August 12 – Anna Held, singer (born 1872 in Poland)
 August 14 – Anna Morton, Second Lady of the United States (born 1846)
 September 12 – Joseph Clay Stiles Blackburn, U.S. Senator from Kentucky from 1885 to 1897 and from 1901 to 1907 (born 1838)
 September 28
 True Boardman, silent film actor (born 1882)
 Freddie Stowers, African American corporal (killed in action; born 1896)
 September 29 – Frank Luke, fighter pilot (killed in action; born 1897)
 October 8 – James B. McCreary, 27th and 37th Governor of Kentucky from 1875 to 1879 and from 1911 to 1915, U.S. Senator from Kentucky from 1903 to 1909 (born 1838)
 October 16 – Felix Arndt, pianist and composer (born 1889)
 October 19 – Harold Lockwood, silent film actor (born 1887)
 October 21
Wesley Newcomb Hohfeld, professor of jurisprudence (born 1879)
Jennie O. Starkey, journalist (born ca. 1856)
 October 22 – Myrtle Gonzalez, silent film actress (born 1891)
 October 28 – Edward Bouchet, physicist (born 1852)
 November 4 – Andrew Dickson White, diplomat, academic and author (born 1832)
 November 19 – Joseph F. Smith, Mormon leader (born 1838)
 December – Sarah Jim Mayo, Washoe basket weaver (born 1858)
 December 17 – John Green Brady, 5th Governor of the District of Alaska from 1897 to 1906 (born 1847)
 December 26 – William Hampton Patton, entomologist (born 1853)

See also
 List of American films of 1918
 Timeline of United States history (1900–1929)

References

External links
 
 

 
1910s in the United States
United States
United States
Years of the 20th century in the United States